The Miami RedHawks women's basketball team represents Miami University in women's basketball. The school competes in the Mid-American Conference in Division I of the National Collegiate Athletic Association (NCAA). The Redhawks play home basketball games at Millett Hall in Oxford, Ohio.

Season-by-season record
As of the 2015–16 season, the Redhawks have a 627–553 record, with a 323–260 record in the Mid-American Conference. Miami has won the Mid-American Conference women's basketball tournament twice, in 1982 and 2008, while finishing as runner-up in 1983, 1990, and 1995. They have won the regular season championship 4 times, the East Division twice, while making one appearance in the NCAA Tournament and three appearances in the Women's National Invitation Tournament (WNIT).

Postseason appearances

NCAA Division I

AIAW Division I
The RedHawks, then known as the Redskins, made one appearance in the AIAW National Division I basketball tournament, with a combined record of 0–1.

References

External links